William Henry Smith, FRS (24 June 1825 – 6 October 1891) was an English bookseller and newsagent of the family firm W H Smith, who expanded the firm and introduced the practice of selling books and newspapers at railway stations.  He was elected a Member of Parliament in 1868 and rose to the position of First Lord of the Admiralty less than ten years thereafter.  Because of his lack of naval experience, he was perceived as a model for the character Sir Joseph Porter in H.M.S. Pinafore.  In the mid-1880s, he was twice Secretary of State for War, and later First Lord of the Treasury and Leader of the House of Commons, among other posts.

Background and business career
The son of William Henry Smith (1792–1865), Smith was born in London.  He was educated at Tavistock Grammar School before joining his father's newsagent and book business in 1846, at which time the firm became W H Smith & Son. Both men took advantage of the railway boom by opening news-stands on railway stations, starting with Euston in 1848.

In 1850 the firm opened depots in Birmingham, Manchester and Liverpool.  The business became a household name (W H Smith), and Smith junior used the success of the firm as a springboard into politics.

In February 1878, he was elected a Fellow of the Royal Society.

Political career
In 1868, Smith was elected Member of Parliament for Westminster as a Conservative after an initial attempt to get into Parliament as a "Liberal-Conservative" in 1865 as a supporter of Prime Minister  Lord Palmerston. In 1874, Smith was appointed Financial Secretary to the Treasury when Disraeli returned as Prime Minister.  In 1877, he became First Lord of the Admiralty even though he never went to sea throughout his life. It has been claimed that Smith's appointment was the inspiration for the character of Sir Joseph Porter, KCB, in Gilbert and Sullivan's 1878 comic opera, H.M.S. Pinafore.

Gilbert had written to Sullivan in December 1877, "The fact that the First Lord in the opera is a Radical of the most pronounced type will do away with any suspicion that W. H. Smith is intended". However, the character was seen as a reflection on Smith, and even Disraeli was overheard to refer to his First Lord as "Pinafore Smith". It has been suggested that the Pinafore character was as much based on Smith's controversial predecessor as First Lord, Hugh Childers, as on Smith himself. Smith held the office for three years until the Liberals returned to power.

In 1885, a redistribution of seats led to Smith now standing for the Strand division in Westminster, and he served as Chief Secretary for Ireland for a short period the following year. He was twice Secretary of State for War, the first time during Lord Salisbury's brief ministry between 1885 and 1886, and the second when the Conservatives won the 1886 general election. He succeeded this appointment in 1887 as First Lord of the Treasury and Leader of the House of Commons and became Lord Warden of the Cinque Ports in 1891.

He died shortly afterwards at Walmer Castle, Kent, and his widow was created Viscountess Hambleden in his honour and took the title from the village close to the Smiths' country house of Greenlands, near Henley-on-Thames, Oxon.  One of the few ministers personally close to Lord Salisbury (apart from the Salisbury's nephew, Arthur Balfour), Smith was dubbed "Old Morality" because of his austere manner and conduct.

Family
Smith married Emily, daughter of Frederick Dawes Danvers, in 1858. They had two sons and four daughters:

 Mabel Danvers Smith (d. 1956; she married the 5th Earl of Harrowby)
Emily Anna Smith (1859–1942; she married Admiral William Acland)
Helen Smith (1860–1944)
Beatrice Danvers Smith (1864–1942)
Henry Walton Smith (1865–1866)
William Frederick Danvers Smith (1868–1928)

He died in October 1891, aged 66. The following month, his widow was raised to the peerage in his honour as Viscountess Hambleden, of Hambleden in the County of Buckingham. She died in August 1913 and was succeeded by her and Smith's only surviving son, Frederick.

Endnotes

Bibliography

Further reading

External links
 
 

|-

1825 births
1891 deaths
British retail company founders
British Secretaries of State
First Lords of the Admiralty
Lords Warden of the Cinque Ports
Leaders of the Conservative Party (UK)
English businesspeople in retailing
Members of the Parliament of the United Kingdom for English constituencies
UK MPs 1868–1874
UK MPs 1874–1880
UK MPs 1880–1885
UK MPs 1885–1886
UK MPs 1886–1892
Stewards of Henley Royal Regatta
Leaders of the House of Commons of the United Kingdom
People associated with the Royal National College for the Blind
Members of the London School Board
Fellows of the Royal Society
Members of the Privy Council of the United Kingdom
Members of the Privy Council of Ireland
Chief Secretaries for Ireland
19th-century English businesspeople